Helga Nadire İnan Ertürk, aka Nadija Inan or Nadja Inan (born Helga Nadire İnan on September 10, 1984), is a Turkish-German women's football midfielder currently playing in the Turkish Women's Second Football League for Sakarya Yenikent Güneşspor in Turkey. She was a member of the Turkey women's national football team between 2008 and 2010.

Playing career

Club
Inan entered in her hometown club FSC Mönchengladbach in July 2003, and played until the end of that year. Then, she played in other German clubs FCR 2001 Duisburg (January 2004 – June 2005) and SG Wattenscheid 09 Women (July 2006 – June 2008).

Inan transferred to FFC Zuchwil 05, competing at the Nationalliga A Women in Switzerland between 2009 and 2011.

In January 2012, she moved to Turkey to play for Sakarya Yenikent Güneşspor with the initiative of her uncle, who is the father of women's national player Burcu Düner.

International
She scored her first goal for Turkey at the UEFA Support Tournament against Estonia women's national football team in 2008. In the UEFA Support Tournament next year, she netted a goal against Macedonian women.

See also
 Turkish women in sports

References

1984 births
Women's association football midfielders
German expatriates in Switzerland
German people of Turkish descent
German women's footballers
Living people
Sportspeople from Mönchengladbach
Turkey women's international footballers
Turkish expatriate sportspeople in Switzerland
Turkish women's footballers
Footballers from North Rhine-Westphalia
FFC Zuchwil 05 players